Life  is a 1984 Chinese drama film directed by Wu Tianming. The film was selected as the Chinese entry for the Best Foreign Language Film at the 57th Academy Awards, but was not accepted as a nominee.

Cast
 Lijing Zhou as Gao Jia-lin
 Yufang Wu as Liu Qiao-zhen
 Baocheng Gao as Grandpa De-shun
 Bai Xue as Qiao Ling

See also
 List of submissions to the 57th Academy Awards for Best Foreign Language Film
 List of Chinese submissions for the Academy Award for Best Foreign Language Film

References

External links
 

1984 films
1984 drama films
Chinese drama films
Chinese-language films
Films directed by Wu Tianming